Reşat Amet (24 January 1975 – 15 March 2014) was a Crimean Tatar activist posthumously awarded the title Hero of Ukraine. Considered as the first deadly victim of the Russo-Ukrainian War.

Abduction and death
On 3 March 2014 Reşat initiated a solitary and peaceful protest against the occupation of Crimea by the Russian troops. During his protest in front of the Crimean Council of Ministers building in Simferopol's Lenin Square, he was abducted by three unidentified men in military uniform from the "Crimean self-defense" detachments who took him away.

On 15 March 2014 Reşat's body was found by the police in a forest near the village of Zemlianychne in Bilohirsk Raion about 60 kilometers east of the Crimean capital. The body was bearing marks of violence and torture, with his head bound with duct-tape and his legs shackled. A pair of handcuffs was laying near his body. According to his brother Refat Amet (Ametov), the cause of death was a stab wound resulting from a knife or a similar pointed object penetrating the eye. Reşat's murder remains unsolved.

Reşat was buried on 18 March 2014 at the Abdalı Muslim Cemetery of Simferopol. He left behind his young wife, Zarina, and three children.

See also
List of kidnappings
List of solved missing person cases
List of unsolved murders

Citations

1975 births
2010s missing person cases
2014 murders in Ukraine
2014 deaths
Crimean Tatar activists
Kidnapped people
Male murder victims
Missing person cases in Ukraine
People from Simferopol
People murdered in Ukraine
People of the annexation of Crimea by the Russian Federation
Recipients of the Order of Gold Star (Ukraine)
Unsolved murders in Ukraine
Ukrainian Muslims
Ukrainian people of Crimean Tatar descent
Deaths by stabbing